Great Pianists of the 20th Century  was a 200-CD box set released by Philips Records in 1999 and sponsored by Steinway & Sons.

The box set comprises 100 volumes featuring 72 pianists of the 20th century, each volume with two CDs and a booklet about the life and work of the featured pianist. The set contains a variety of composers from different eras, from Baroque to Contemporary classical. The material was the result of a collaborative association between Philips (who had access to the Polygram Records back catalogue) and a number of other labels, notably EMI Classics, as no single label possessed a representative set of recordings for every pianist considered to be significant. Material from Warner Classics and Sony Classics was also used.

The majority of the pianists feature on one set only, with sixteen appearing on a second set (set number 8, dedicated to Wilhelm Backhaus, is titled "Wilhelm Backhaus I", which suggests that a second set was planned at some point but never published, and the set dedicated to Daniel Barenboim is correctly numbered as number 9). Seven artists (Arrau, Brendel, Gilels, Horowitz, Kempff, Richter and Rubinstein) are featured across three sets. The nature and size of the project meant that popular works (such as Beethoven's Emperor Concerto, Prokofiev's Third Piano Concerto and Rachmaninov's Rhapsody on a Theme of Paganini, and other solo pieces) appear several times.

Perceptive pianophiles have pointed out various errors in the set, including misattributed recordings and use of unauthorized takes. For example, the Paderewski volume contains a performance of Liszt’s "La Leggierezza" which was actually recorded by Benno Moiseiwitsch – also included in the latter’s volume. Further, the liner notes claim the cadenza of the piece was by Moiseiwitsch, while it was actually by Theodor Leschetizky. The first of two Cortot volumes was withdrawn when it was discovered that a previously rejected performance of Schumann’s Kreisleriana was issued by mistake. The volume was reissued with the correct take. The series has also been criticized for the lack of remastering of historic recordings, notably in the Hofmann reissue which degraded the transfers originally issued by Ward Marston.

The German edition of the set (and possibly others) includes a bonus CD with Clara Haskil (Sonderausgabe zur Edition) —raising to 5 the total number of CDs with her. This bonus CD contains her interpretation of some of Scarlatti's piano sonatas from her 1947 Westminster LP, and is the first printing on CD of these recordings, according to the CD cover (Erstveröffentlichung auf CD).

List of volumes 
Each volume contains two CDs.

 Géza Anda
 Martha Argerich
 Martha Argerich II
 Claudio Arrau
 Claudio Arrau II
 Claudio Arrau III
 Vladimir Ashkenazy
 Wilhelm Backhaus
 Daniel Barenboim
 Jorge Bolet
 Jorge Bolet II
 Alfred Brendel
 Alfred Brendel II
 Alfred Brendel III
 Lyubov Bruk & Mark Taimanov
 Robert Casadesus
 Shura Cherkassky
 Shura Cherkassky II
 Van Cliburn
 Alfred Cortot
 Alfred Cortot II
 Clifford Curzon
 Gyorgy Cziffra
 Christoph Eschenbach
 Edwin Fischer
 Edwin Fischer II
 Leon Fleisher
 Samson Francois
 Nelson Freire
 Ignaz Friedman
 Andrei Gavrilov
 Walter Gieseking
 Walter Gieseking II
 Emil Gilels
 Emil Gilels II
 Emil Gilels III
 Grigory Ginsburg
 Leopold Godowsky
 Glenn Gould
 Friedrich Gulda
 Friedrich Gulda II
 Ingrid Haebler
 Clara Haskil
 Clara Haskil II
 Myra Hess
 Josef Hofmann
 Vladimir Horowitz
 Vladimir Horowitz II
 Vladimir Horowitz III
 Byron Janis
 Byron Janis II
 William Kapell
 Julius Katchen
 Julius Katchen II
 Wilhelm Kempff
 Wilhelm Kempff II
 Wilhelm Kempff III
 Evgeny Kissin
 Zoltán Kocsis
 Stephen Kovacevich
 Stephen Kovacevich II
 Alicia de Larrocha
 Alicia de Larrocha II
 Josef & Rosina Lhévinne
 Dinu Lipatti
 Radu Lupu
 Nikita Magaloff
 Arturo Benedetti Michelangeli
 Arturo Benedetti Michelangeli II
 Benno Moiseiwitsch
 Ivan Moravec
 John Ogdon
 John Ogdon II
 Ignacy Jan Paderewski
 Murray Perahia
 Maria João Pires
 Mikhail Pletnev
 Maurizio Pollini
 Maurizio Pollini II
 André Previn
 Sergei Rachmaninoff
 Sviatoslav Richter
 Sviatoslav Richter II
 Sviatoslav Richter III
 Arthur Rubinstein 
 Arthur Rubinstein II
 Arthur Rubinstein III
 András Schiff
 Artur Schnabel
 Rudolf Serkin
 Vladimir Sofronitsky
 Solomon
 Rosalyn Tureck
 Rosalyn Tureck II
 Mitsuko Uchida
 André Watts
 Alexis Weissenberg
 Earl Wild
 Maria Yudina
 Krystian Zimerman

References

Citations

General sources 
 Gutmann, Peter (1999, 2005). "Great Pianists of the Twentieth Century" at the Classical Notes website.
 Manildi, Donald; Malik, Farhan (2012). A Buyer's Guide to Historic Piano Recordings Reissued on Compact Discs. International Piano Archives at Maryland, University of Maryland, University Libraries website.

1999 compilation albums
Classical music compilation albums
Compilation album series
PolyGram compilation albums